WWLB (93.1 FM) is a non-commercial broadcast radio station licensed to Ettrick, Virginia, serving the Petersburg/Richmond area. WWLB is owned and operated by VPM Media Corporation. Along with sister station WBBT-FM in Powhatan, the station is branded as VPM Music, and is a companion service of the area's flagship NPR station, WCVE-FM. WWLB serves the southern portion of the Richmond market, while WBBT serves the northern portion.

History
On October 20, 2014, WLFV changed their format from country (as "The Wolf", which moved to sister station WWLB 98.9 FM) to classic country, branded as "93.1 Hank FM". The following day, the FCC authorized a swap of callsigns between the stations at 93.1 FM (now WWLB) and 98.9 FM (now WLFV).

On December 20, 2017, Commonwealth Public Broadcasting Corporation announced that they would acquire WWLB and sister station, WBBT; WCVE-FM's music programming will move to the frequencies upon closure of the sale. The purchase closed on February 15, 2018.

On June 1, 2018, WWLB and WBBT-FM switched to a new format, "WCVE Music", which assumes and augments the prior music programming of WCVE-FM. On August 5, 2019, WWLB and WBBT-FM were both rebranded as "VPM Music."

References

External links

WLB
Radio stations established in 2000
2000 establishments in Virginia
Public radio stations in the United States